The Mount Edwards railway line was a branch railway in the Scenic Rim region of South East Queensland, Australia. The lines serves a number of small towns in the Fassifern Valley. The first stage of the Mount Edwards line opened from Munbilla to Engelsburg (now Kalbar) on 17 April 1916, but the next stage to Mount Edwards was not completed until 7 October 1922. The line closed on 1 November 1960.

Geography 
The 25 km long line branched off the Dugandan line at the rural locality of Munbilla 38 km south of the city of Ipswich. The line then proceeded in a generally south-westerly direction to the locality of Mount Edwards near the village of Aratula.

History 
The line was intended to form part of a via recta (Latin, "straight route") between Brisbane and Sydney via the break-of-gauge border town of Wallangarra. Before the completion of the New South Wales North Coast Line in 1930, rail traffic between the two state capitals travelled west from Brisbane to Toowoomba then south to Wallangarra via Warwick. The via recta was to incorporate the Mount Edwards line and the Maryvale line on the other side of the Great Dividing Range to produce a direct route southwest from Brisbane to Warwick, shaving around 95 km off the interstate journey. However, the via recta was never completed.

Route

See also 

Rail transport in Queensland

References

External links
 1925 map of the Queensland railway system
 Via Recta – The Railway That Never Was

Railway lines opened in 1922
Closed railway lines in Queensland
Railway lines closed in 1960
Scenic Rim Region
1922 establishments in Australia
1960 disestablishments in Australia